Zeta One is a 1969 British comedy science fiction film directed by Michael Cort and starring James Robertson Justice, Charles Hawtrey and Dawn Addams.

Plot
A spy for Section 5, James Word, finds a secretary for the section waiting as he returns home. As they play strip poker, he tells about tailing Major Bourdon. Bourdon was  conducting an investigation into the women from Angvia. The Angvians are led by Zeta, and are an all-women secret society. The Angvians regularly abducted other planet's women into their ranks where they were brainwashed to become operatives. Their next target is stripper ‘Ted’ Strain and so Section 5 uses her to set a trap for them. As Bourdon’s men take several of the Angvian agents prisoner, a final confrontation between the various parties occurs at his estate

Cast
 James Robertson Justice as Major Bourdon
 Charles Hawtrey as Swyne
 Robin Hawdon as James Word
 Anna Gaël as Clotho
 Dawn Addams as Zeta
 Brigitte Skay as Lachesis
 Valerie Leon as Atropos
 Lionel Murton as W
 Yutte Stensgaard as Ann Olsen
 Wendy Lingham as Edwina 'Ted' Strain
 Carol Hawkins as Zara
 Rita Webb as Clippie
 Steve Kirby as Sleth
 Paul Baker as Bourdon's Assistant
 Angela Grant as Angvia Girl
 Kirsten Betts as Angvia Girl

Production
Zeta One was the first film shot at Camden Studios, which was formerly a wallpaper factory in North London. The plot of the film was based on a comic strip short story in the magazine Zeta. Art director Christopher Neame designed the film's sets. Location shooting took place around the city. The film was produced and distributed by the independent company Tigon Films run by Tony Tenser.

Release
Zeta One was released in the United Kingdom in 1969. The film was not a commercial success on its release.

It was made for a budget of £60,000.

It was released in America by Film Ventures International, briefly in 1973 as The Love Slaves and then wider in 1974 under the titles Alien Women and The Love Factor. It was released as a Blu-ray DVD in 2013.

Reception
The film received negative reviews on its initial release. In the Monthly Film Bulletin, David McGillivray described the film's themes as "quite preposterous in illogicality and silliness". The movie was given 1 out of 5 stars, stating the movie was basically softcore pornography. Moria Reviews noted it is an odd mix of the James Bond type movies with a sex comedy.

References

External links

1969 films
British science fiction comedy films
1960s English-language films
1960s science fiction comedy films
1969 comedy films
Films shot in London
Parody films based on James Bond films